Hans Engnestangen (28 March 1908 – 9 May 2003) was a Norwegian speed skater and world champion. He held the world records over 500 and 1500 meters for more than 13 years.

International championships
At the 1932 Winter Olympics he participated in the 10000 metres event but was eliminated in the heats. Four years later he finished eights in the 1500 metres competition. He also participated in the 500 metres event but did not finish.

Engnestangen won a gold medal at the 1933 World Allround Championships, and a bronze medal in 1935. He won the 500 m event in 1933, 1938 and 1939, and the 1500 m in 1937 and 1938. He received a silver medal at the 1937 European Allround Championships, where he also won the 500 m race.

World records
In January 1933 Engnestangen broke the Clas Thunberg's world record over 500 m, with 42.5, a record which lasted until 1936. Engnestangen improved the time in January 1937 (42.3), and again in February 1938 (41.8). The last record was unbeaten for 14 years, until 1952.

In January 1939 Engnestangen set a world record over 1500 m at 2:13.8. This record was unbeaten for 13 years.

Source: SpeedSkatingStats.com

World War II
Along with fellow speed skater Finn Hodt, Engnestangen had been one of the few leading Norwegian athletes not to follow a nationwide boycott of sports events (the "sports strike") during the occupation. In particular, in 1942 he skated in a Norway-Germany meet in Klagenfurt in Austria. The boycott had been launched by the Norwegian sports leadership in response to attempts from 1940 onwards by the collaborationist Quisling regime at nazification of all sports events in Norway. After the war Engnestangen was sentenced to two years for collaborating with the Nazi Germany, though contrary to other involved sportsmen he had no personal connection to Nazis.

References

External links

1908 births
2003 deaths
Norwegian male speed skaters
Olympic speed skaters of Norway
Speed skaters at the 1932 Winter Olympics
Speed skaters at the 1936 Winter Olympics
World record setters in speed skating
People convicted of treason for Nazi Germany against Norway
World Allround Speed Skating Championships medalists